Barrington Christian Academy (BCA) is private Christian school in Barrington, Rhode Island, UnitedStates.  The school started in the 1979–1980 school year by the neighboring Barrington Baptist Church and was made into an elementary and middle school containing grades K-8.  From 1984–1986, the school incorporated a high school.  Due to budget issues, the high school was discontinued and the school was left with grades K-8.  At the beginning of the 2005 school year, the BCA board began to discuss the possibility of re-establishing the high school.  The following year, a freshmen class of eleven students enrolled.

Presently, the high school has been established for over 8 years.  During the 2007–2008 school year, the building underwent major construction to add an addition to be used primarily for the high school classes and to provide enhanced teacher workspaces and a counseling office.  The addition contains four classrooms, a science lab, a conference room, a music room, and a new library to be enjoyed by the entire school.

The Barrington Christian Academy is accredited by the Association of Christian Schools International (ACSI) and the New England Association of Schools & Colleges. During 2007, BCA also gained permission to receive I20's from foreign students.

Academical studies

Athletics
The elementary students are offered the intramural sports of soccer, basketball, and athletics during the designated season.  Every student that wants to be on the team is able to be on it, with the exception of athletic probation because of grades.  With the exception of track, the sport is split into an A-team and a B-team, with the A-team players having the higher level of skill.  The teams compete with other private schools throughout Rhode Island.  The A-team basketball players usually compete in a tournament at the end of the season.  The track team members travel to Pennsylvania to compete in a track meet every May. Rebecca Marshall, daughter of BCA legend Cheryl Marshall, was a 3-time recipient of the Christian Character award and 1-time recipient of the Most Improved Player award.

As the high school grows, more and more sports will be offered.  In the first year of the high school, track and girls basketball were offered.  The girls basketball team only consisted of freshmen, but the team had a winning season with coach Sandra Boutcher.  The second year, track, girls basketball, and boys basketball were offered.  The girls basketball team really excelled in the second year of the program with Ed Guida coaching. The team competed against teams from Rhode Island, Massachusetts, and Connecticut and came out with a winning season.  The team competed in the ACSI Tournament in Vermont and placed third in a Varsity tournament with only freshmen and sophomores on the team.  Although the boys basketball team did not have a winning season, the boys improved greatly under the coaching of A.D. Al Wright. In the fall of 2008, a Co-Ed Soccer team was added to the high school program.  Boys and girls basketball is scheduled for the winter season, track for spring, and possibly a collaboration of softball with another Christian high school.

The arts

Visual arts
Because the high school is new, students are able to help form the arts curriculum according to their own interests and passions.  In the 2007–2008 school year, sophomores spent a quarter drawing, then chose between acrylic painting and drama for the following two quarters.  After their missions trip to Mendenhall, Mississippi at the beginning of the fourth quarter, sophomores prepared a presentation that encapsulated their experience using talents ranging from mime to cross stitch.  Freshmen spent the first two quarters in drama.  For the third quarter they were allowed to choose between computer design and drama, and the fourth quarter was used as an introduction to the visual arts.  
The high school had its first real art show at the end of May 2008 where nearly 150 pieces were displayed, and each student was represented. In the future, the school hopes to offer courses in sculpture, ceramics, watercolor, pastel, and more.

Performing arts
A large part of school is the performing arts.  Each year a Christmas play is produced, for which students in grades 1-7 audition to get a part.  Every year the 8th grade puts on a play as part of their English class under the direction of Jenna Tremblay.

At the end of the 2006–2007 school year, the high school put on a production of You're A Good Man, Charlie Brown.  Angela Williams directed the entire freshman class to put on an amazing performance of the musical.  During the 2007–2008 school year, the sophomores and freshmen began to prepare a production of Godspell, but with the main character leaving the school suddenly and other mishaps, the musical was not done.  Later that year, Angela Williams directed several of the sophomore and freshmen girls in performing several skits and mimes about topics such as the Debtor from the Bible, as well as a comic rendition of the Prodigal Son.

Transportation
Public school bus transportation is provided to Barrington Christian Academy for students who live in Barrington, Warren, Bristol, East Providence, Providence, Lincoln, Cranston, Pawtucket, and Johnston, Rhode Island.

Scrip program
For two years (at the present) Barrington Christian Academy has participated in a scrip program that allows families to purchase gift cards for well-known vendors.  In return for the business, the vendors donate a certain percentage of the money to the school.  The school has used this money to get new playground equipment.  For a listing of the vendors and the percentage of money that is donated, please see the family order form.

References

External links
 BCA (Barrington Christian Academy)
 ACSI (Association of Christian Schools International)
 NEASC (New England Association of Schools & Colleges)

Buildings and structures in Barrington, Rhode Island
Schools in Bristol County, Rhode Island
Private middle schools in Rhode Island
Private elementary schools in Rhode Island